Ace 2 (stylized as ACE 2 as acronym for Air Combat Emulator) is a combat flight simulator video game developed by Cascade Games for various home computers released in 1987, and a sequel to Ace. The player takes the role of a fighter jet pilot on modern day missions in the Middle East. The display shows the plane's instrumentation and cockpit view.

The game received mixed reviews from critics, with some praising the game for its new control scheme and introduction of multiplayer, while others criticized it for being oversimplified compared to its predecessor.

Gameplay 
Compared to its predecessor, the game is much more simplified in terms of controls and is now largely focused on dogfighting between two enemy jet fighters. While being optimized for two players, it also supports singleplayer play against an AI controlled jet.

Flight controls were simplified to just the joystick and pressing the keyboard to increase or decrease the throttle. A map of the area can be called up at any time, showing the position of the player and the enemy.

Reception 

The Games Machine said that it was "an excellent two-player head-to-head combat game", and calling it "very fast, very playable, and, more often than not, very tense".

ZZap!64 called the game "fun" despite being "oversimplified", and saying it was a "good game in its own right" despite the fact that fans of the original might be disappointed.

Computer and Video Games said "the fiddly controls are kept to a bare minimum".

References 

1987 video games
Amstrad CPC games
Commodore 16 and Plus/4 games
Commodore 64 games
DOS games
Combat flight simulators
Multiplayer and single-player video games
Video game sequels
Video games developed in the United Kingdom
ZX Spectrum games